Juan Carlos Buzzetti (born 26 February 1945 in Montevideo) is a Uruguayan football manager who last coached Fiji national football team.

He managed the national team of Vanuatu from 2000 to 2004 and Fiji from 2006 to 2009. As of December 2011, he returned to managing Fiji again.

References

External links
 Profile

1945 births
Living people
People from Montevideo
Uruguayan football managers
Uruguayan people of Italian descent
Expatriate football managers in Vanuatu
Vanuatu national football team managers
Expatriate football managers in Fiji
Fiji national football team managers
Uruguayan expatriate sportspeople in Fiji
Uruguayan expatriate sportspeople in Vanuatu
Uruguayan expatriate football managers